William Doerrfeld (born April 3, 1964 ) is an American classical and jazz pianist and composer.

His primary focus is on compositions for classical symphonic orchestra, classical and jazz solo piano, and his fusion piano trio. In October 2014, Doerrfeld started the Doerrfeld Trio.

Biography

Youth 
Doerrfeld started playing piano at the age of 4. At the age of 14, Yamaha invited him to perform his solo jazz piano work "Unidentified Flying Fingers" at the Togo no Sato Interior Hall in Japan as part of their 7th Junior Original Concert in 1978. He received a BMI Student Composer Award, a New York Youth Symphony commission and Carnegie Hall orchestral premiere performance.

Education and performances
Doerrfeld earned degrees in classical piano and composition from Eastman School of Music, and Yale School of Music.

Doerrfeld's compositions have been performed by the Baltimore Symphony Orchestra, Saint Petersburg State Symphony Orchestra, and Lamont Symphony. He has been a featured guest of the Northwest Sinfonietta and the Methow Music Festival. His piano compositions have been performed by Ralph Votapek.

On November 16, 2010, Doerrfeld released his debut album titled Time and Again followed by A Passing Moment and Flurious.

Awards and honors
Doerrfeld received awards from Banff Centre, MacDowell Artist Colony, Tanglewood, and Yaddo.

Discography 
 Time and Again (Jassical, 2010)
 A Passing Moment (Jassical, 2011)
 Flurious (Jassical, 2012)

References

External links 
 Official site

Living people
1964 births
American male classical composers
American classical composers
American classical pianists
Male classical pianists
American male pianists
20th-century classical composers
21st-century classical composers
American jazz musicians
American jazz pianists
American jazz composers
American male jazz composers
Musicians from Chicago
21st-century American composers
20th-century American composers
20th-century American pianists
Jazz musicians from Illinois
Classical musicians from Illinois
21st-century classical pianists
20th-century American male musicians
21st-century American male musicians
21st-century American pianists
20th-century jazz composers
21st-century jazz composers